Jinping Hydropower Station may refer to:

Jinping 1 Hydropower Station, in China
Jinping 2 Hydropower Station, in China